Sir David Charles Calcutt QC (2 November 1930 – 11 August 2004) was an eminent barrister and public servant, knighted in 1991. He was the Master of Magdalene College, Cambridge from 1985 to 1994. He was also responsible for the creation of the Press Complaints Commission. He is buried in the churchyard of St Beuno's Church at Culbone, Somerset.

Early life and education

Calcutt was born at Marlow, Buckinghamshire, where his father, Henry, a pharmacist, ran a local high-street chemist's shop.

Calcutt was a chorister in the choir of Christ Church Cathedral, Oxford, whilst attending Christ Church Cathedral School, then went on to Cranleigh School. As an undergraduate at the University of Cambridge he was a choral scholar in the Choir of King's College, Cambridge.

Calcutt was known throughout the 1980s and 1990s for preparing reports and inquiries into various areas of public life. he was asked to produce a report on a fire in the Falkland Islands in which eight people died, then soon afterwards to produce a report into the Cyprus Seven spy affair, in which seven servicemen were acquitted of having passed secrets to the Russians. He is most famous for suggesting the creation of the Press Complaints Commission in 1990, though he was later quite scathing about it, describing it as 

In 1969, he married Barbara Walker, a psychiatric worker. She died in 2015. In later life Calcutt developed Parkinson's disease, but he remained "cheerful and genial".

References

ie

1930 births
2004 deaths
Alumni of King's College, Cambridge
Fellows of Magdalene College, Cambridge
Masters of Magdalene College, Cambridge
English barristers
Knights Bachelor
Lawyers awarded knighthoods
Members of the Middle Temple
English King's Counsel
English legal scholars
20th-century English lawyers